Pain Lamuk (also Romanized as Pā’īn Lamūk) is a village in Bisheh Sar Rural District, in the Central District of Qaem Shahr County, Mazandaran Province, Iran. At the 2006 census, its population was 529, in 147 families.

References 

Populated places in Qaem Shahr County